Farai Mudariki (born 13 February 1995) is a Zimbabwe rugby union player. His usual position is as a Prop, and he currently plays for Worcester Warriors.

References

External links
itsrugby.co.uk Profile

1995 births
Living people
Zimbabwean rugby union players
Zimbabwe international rugby union players
Rugby union props
USON Nevers players